The 2002 United States House of Representatives elections in Virginia were held on November 5, 2002, to determine who will represent the Commonwealth of Virginia in the United States House of Representatives. Virginia has eleven seats in the House, apportioned according to the 2000 United States census. Representatives are elected for two-year terms.

Overview

District 1

District 2

District 3

District 4

District 5

District 6

District 7

District 8

District 9

District 10

District 11

References

See also

 United States House elections, 2002

Virginia
2002
2002 Virginia elections